Antonio Lefcochilo Dusmani (Antonios Lefkocheilos Dousmanis; c. 1800–1890)  was a Count of Corfu and politician of the United States of the Ionian Islands.

Life 
A descendant of the Dushmani family he was born in Corfu in c. 1800 as a member of the local Venetian nobility. His aunt was married to the writer Lorenzo Mabilli. Dusmani's grandchildren include Viktor and Sofoklis Dousmanis.

In 1833 Dusmani was appointed under-secretary of the Ionian Senate, and in 1834 he was made secretary of the political department. He became the secretary of the general department in 1853, while from 1841 to 1857 he served as secretary of the general commission on public instruction. For his services to the British crown he was appointed Knight Commander of Order of St Michael and St George on 26 September 1849.
After the union of the Ionian Islands with Greece in 1864, Dusmani translated into Italian from English the records of William Ewart Gladstone's mission to the Ionian Islands and published them in 1869.

Sources

Further reading 

1800s births
1890 deaths
Politicians from Corfu
Antonio
Italian-language writers
Translators from English
Translators to Italian
Knights Commander of the Order of St Michael and St George
Counts
United States of the Ionian Islands people
19th-century translators